The Jeddah Derby, also called the Derby of the Mermaid, is the name given to football matches contested between Al-Ahli and Al-Ittihad, both from Jeddah, Saudi Arabia. For more than 70 years, it used to be the longest running top-flight derby in Saudi Arabian football. The rivalry started in 1951 and is considered to be one of the strongest and most viewed matches in Asia and the Arab world. The rivalry was halted when Al-Ahli were relegated in 2022 to the first division league for the first time in their history.

History
The first-ever match between these two teams was in 1951. The two teams played a friendly match in Al-Saban Stadium in Jeddah which ended 0–0. In 1958, both teams met each other in the final of the Crown Prince Cup in what would be the first final between these two teams. Over 12,000 fans attended the match at the Al-Saban Stadium in Jeddah. Al-Ittihad defeated Al-Ahli 3–2 to lift their first Crown Prince Cup trophy. The first league match between the two sides was during the first season of the Saudi League, the 1976–77 season. Al-Ahli won the match 2–0 thanks to goals from Saad Al-Harbi and Idris Adam. Saeed Ghurab is the top scorer of the derby with 20 goals, 17 for Al-Ittihad and 3 for Al-Ahli. The clubs have met each other in 12 finals, with Al-Ittihad winning 7 and Al-Ahli winning 5.

Official match results 
As of 11 February 2021.
Source:

Dates are in dd/mm/yyyy form.
 SF = Semi-finals
 QF = Quarter-finals
 R16 = Round of 16
 R32 = Round of 32
 GS = Group stage
 R1 = Round 1
 R2 = Round 2

1 1987 King Cup Second Round match won 4–3 on penalties by Al-Ittihad after both teams were tied 0–0.
2 2005–06 Crown Prince Cup quarter-final won 4–2 on penalties by Al-Ahli after both teams were tied 1–1.
3 2011 King Cup Final won 4–2 on penalties by Al-Ahli after both teams were tied 0–0.

Records

Most goals in a match 
 10 goals on 24 October 1966 Al-Ittihad 8–2 Al-Ahli
 8 goals on 5 October 1987 Al-Ahli 4–4 Al-Ittihad
 7 goals on 2 May 1960 Al-Ittihad 7–0 Al-Ahli
 7 goals on 15 October 1968 Al-Ahli 4–3 Al-Ittihad
 7 goals on 10 April 1983 Al-Ahli 5–2 Al-Ittihad
 7 goals on 26 February 2022 Al-Ittihad 4–3 Al-Ahli

Al-Ahli biggest wins 
* Four or more goals difference, OR Al-Ahli scored five or above
 Al-Ahli 5–1 Al-Ittihad on 13 November 1965
 Al-Ahli 4–0 Al-Ittihad on 18 October 1969
 Al-Ahli 4–0 Al-Ittihad on 3 July 1973
 Al-Ahli 5–0 Al-Ittihad on 28 May 1976
 Al-Ahli 4–0 Al-Ittihad on 8 June 1979
 Al-Ahli 5–2 Al-Ittihad on 10 April 1983

Al-Ittihad biggest wins 
* Four or more goals difference, OR Al-Ittihad scored five or above
 Al-Ittihad 7–0 Al-Ahli on 2 May 1960
 Al-Ittihad 8–2 Al-Ahli on 24 October 1966

Highest Attendance 
* 45,000 or above
 59,026 – Al-Ahli 1–1 Al-Ittihad (19 December 2014) (King Abdullah Sports City)
 54,256 – Al-Ittihad 0–1 Al-Ahli (31 December 2015) (King Abdullah Sports City)
 52,909 – Al-Ittihad 1–4 Al-Ahli (3 February 2017) (King Abdullah Sports City)
 49,732 – Al-Ahli 1–1 Al-Ittihad (23 September 2019) (King Abdullah Sports City)
 47,223 – Al-Ittihad 3–2 Al-Ahli (27 December 2016) (King Abdullah Sports City)
 46,977 – Al-Ittihad 0–3 Al-Ahli (22 November 2015) (King Abdullah Sports City)
 46,527 – Al-Ittihad 1–3 Al-Ahli (25 November 2018) (King Abdullah Sports City)
 45,913 – Al-Ittihad 0–0 Al-Ahli (4 February 2018) (King Abdullah Sports City)
 45,000 – Al-Ittihad 2–1 Al-Ahli (17 May 2000) (Prince Abdullah Al Faisal Stadium)

Statistics
Statistics as of 26 February 2022.

Top scorers
Below is the list of players who have scored at least four goals in official meetings.

Players who played for both clubs
Source:

Al-Ahli then Al-Ittihad
 1960:  Turki Bafarrat
 1963:  Mubarak Abo Ghanam
 1963:  Saleh Kadour
 1963:  Abdulraouf Labbad
 1979:  Saeed Ghurab
 1985:  Mousa Marzouq
 2000:  Khaled Masaad
 2001:  Haitham Al-Johani
 2001:  Sérgio Ricardo (via Al-Hilal)
 2002:  Hussain Al-Qoozi
 2003:  Abdullah Al-Waked
 2004:  Ibrahim Al-Shahrani
 2004:  Khaled Gahwji
 2005:  Tisir Al-Antaif (via Al-Khaleej)
 2008:  Talal Al-Meshal (via Al-Nassr, then Al-Markhiya)
 2011:  Ibrahim Hazzazi
 2015:  Majed Al-Khaibari (via Najran)
 2016:  Ahmed Al-Aoufi
 2018:  Mansoor Al-Harbi
 2019:  Hamdan Al-Shamrani (via Al-Faisaly)

Al-Ittihad then Al-Ahli
 1957:  Abdulaziz Hussam Aldin
 1959:  Abdulrahman Katlooj
 1960:  Ibrahim Ashmawi
 1962:  Ahmed Hammad
 1962:  Ghazi Nasser
 1964:  Mohammed Omar Rajkhan
 1970:  Saeed Ghurab (via Al-Nassr)
 1972:  Adel Rawas
 1999:  Salem Suwaid
 2003:  Mohammed Al-Khilaiwi (via Al-Arabi)
 2015:  Majed Kanabah
 2016:  Marquinho (via Udinese)
 2016:  Abdulfattah Asiri
 2019:  Sultan Mendash (via Al-Faisaly)
 2020:  Talal Al-Absi (via Al-Taawoun)

References

Ittihad FC
Al-Ahli Saudi FC
Football rivalries in Saudi Arabia